Matt Solway (born 11 February 1985) is an international lawn bowler from Guernsey. He is a six time European champion and has represented Guernsey at the Commonwealth Games on two occasions.

Biography
Solway has won six titles at the European Bowls Championships; the pairs, mixed pairs and team in 2015 and pairs and team in 2017 and the pairs in 2022. In 2018, he made his Commonwealth Games debut for Guernsey at the 2018 Commonwealth Games. He has also competed in the 2016 World Outdoor Bowls Championship and was due to compete in the cancelled 2020 World Outdoor Bowls Championship.

In 2022, he was selected for the 2022 Commonwealth Games in Birmingham where he competed in the men's pairs event.

References

1985 births
Living people
Guernsey male bowls players
Bowls players at the 2022 Commonwealth Games
Commonwealth Games competitors for Guernsey
Bowls European Champions